Breno Henrique Vasconcelos Lopes (born 24 January 1996), known as Breno Lopes or simply Breno, is a Brazilian footballer who plays as a forward for Palmeiras.

Club career

Early career
Born in Belo Horizonte, Minas Gerais, Breno Lopes joined Cruzeiro's youth setup at the age of 11, but was released four years later. He subsequently represented São José-RS, Cerâmica and Joinville, where he finished his formation.

Joinville
Breno Lopes made his first team debut for Joinville on 6 March 2016, coming on as a second-half substitute for Welinton Júnior in a 2–1 Campeonato Catarinense home win against Guarani de Palhoça. In June, after featuring rarely, he joined Juventus de Jaraguá on loan for the Catarinense Série B, and scored his first senior goal on his debut for the club on 24 July, a 1–1 away draw against Porto-SC.

Upon returning in January 2017, Breno Lopes started to feature regularly for JEC. In December 2018, after the club was relegated to the Série D, he took a legal action against the club due to unpaid wages, and subsequently terminated his contract.

Juventude
On 22 January 2019, Breno Lopes was presented at Série C side Juventude; Joinville also retained 50% of his economic rights. On 4 October, after helping the club achieve promotion to the Série B, he was loaned to Figueirense until the end of the campaign; subsequently, a loan to Athletico Paranaense for the 2020 Campeonato Paranaense was also agreed.

On 29 April 2020, Breno Lopes left Furacão as his loan contract expired, and returned to Juventude, where he impressed during the year's second division.

Palmeiras

On 10 November 2020, Juventude announced the transfer of Breno Lopes to Palmeiras in the top tier. He made his debut in the main category five days later, replacing Willian in a 2–0 home success over Fluminense. On 30 January 2021, he scored the winning goal for Palmeiras in a 1–0 win over Santos in the 2020 Copa Libertadores Final, nine minutes into stoppage time.

Career statistics

Honours
Athletico Paranaense
Campeonato Paranaense: 2020

Palmeiras
Copa Libertadores: 2020, 2021
Campeonato Brasileiro: 2022
Recopa Sudamericana: 2022
Campeonato Paulista: 2022

References

External links

1996 births
Living people
Brazilian footballers
Association football forwards
Campeonato Brasileiro Série A players
Campeonato Brasileiro Série B players
Campeonato Brasileiro Série C players
Campeonato Brasileiro Série D players
Joinville Esporte Clube players
Grêmio Esportivo Juventus players
Esporte Clube Juventude players
Figueirense FC players
Club Athletico Paranaense players
Sociedade Esportiva Palmeiras players
Footballers from Belo Horizonte